Shazz Preston (born c. 2003) is an American football wide receiver for the Alabama Crimson Tide.

Preston attended St. James High School in Saint James, Louisiana. He competed in football, basketball, and  track and field while in high school. He was ranked by ESPN as the No. 16 recruit in college football's class of 2022 and the No. 3 receiver.

Preston committed to the Alabama Crimson Tide. He enrolled at the University of Alabama in May 2022.

References 
 He was also a Class 3A State Champion in Highschool

External links
 Alabama Crimson Tidee bio

Living people
American football wide receivers
Alabama Crimson Tide football players
Players of American football from Louisiana
Year of birth missing (living people)